The 1957 All-Ireland Minor Hurling Championship was the 27th staging of the All-Ireland Minor Hurling Championship since its establishment by the Gaelic Athletic Association in 1928. The championship began on 31 March 1957 and ended on 2 September 1957.

Tipperary entered the championship as the defending champions in search of a third successive title.

On 2 September 1957 Tipperary won the championship following a 4-7 to 3-7 defeat of Kilkenny in the All-Ireland final. This was their third All-Ireland title in-a-row and their 11th title overall.

Team summaries

Results

Connacht Minor Hurling Championship

Leinster Minor Hurling Championship

Munster Minor Hurling Championship

First round

Semi-final

Final

Ulster Minor Hurling Championship

All-Ireland Minor Hurling Championship

Semi-finals

Final

Statistics

Miscellaneous

 Jimmy Doyle of Tipperary became the first player to win three All-Ireland medals. It is a record that still stands as of 2019.

External links
 All-Ireland Minor Hurling Championship: Roll Of Honour

Minor
All-Ireland Minor Hurling Championship